Raman Sankar (30 April 1909 – 7 November 1972) was an Indian politician, statesman, administrator, orator, educationist, writer and editor who served as the 3rd Chief Minister of Kerala from 1962 to 1964. He is the only Chief Minister of Kerala to have been ousted through No-confidence motion.

Early life 

He was born to Raman Panickar and Kunchaliamma on 30 April 1909 in Kuzhikkalidavaka village in Puthoor, Kollam district. He did his formal education in the Puthoor Primary School and later continued in an English School in Kottarakkara. In 1924, he joined Maharajas College (present University College) to gain a degree in Chemistry. He was supported financially for his education by a wealthy relative, as his father could not afford the expenses. He also worked as a teacher for a short span of time before he moved to the Government Law College, Thiruvananthapuram in 1933.

His appointment as principal of Sivagiri High School made him associate with the activities of the Sree Narayana Dharma Paripalana Yogam (SNDP Yogam). He talked about the social injustice prevalent in those days, particularly the discriminatory attitude shown towards backward class communities, and also equal opportunities for backward classes.

As the leader of SNDP Yogam and Congress
Having started public life as a teacher and lawyer, he was drawn to freedom movement and became an active member of the Indian National Congress in Travancore State. After India’s independence he focused his attention on strengthening the Congress party.

Later, he took a break from the Congress party and began to work in the SNDP Yogam. During his long association with the SNDP Yogam of over 13 years, he served as its General Secretary for over a span of 10 years and President and Chief of the SN Trust. Under his leadership the SNDP Yogam gave emphasis to the field of education and started many educational institutions. SNDP Yogam celebrated its Golden Jubilee year while Sankar was the General Secretary in 1953. As part of a year-long celebration he organised an Exhibition in Kollam which is marked in the history of the State as 'SNDP Kanaka Jubilee'. 
 
Sankar returned to the Congress and was elected to the Travancore-Cochin State Assembly in 1948 and stayed as a member of the State Assembly from 1949 to 1956. Sankar was member of the Constituent Assembly and also member of the Franchise and Delimitation Commission and the Reforms Committee constituted after the introduction of the Responsible Government.

He led the Congress party as Kerala Pradesh Congress Committee (KPCC) President during the Vimochana Samaram (Liberation Struggle) in 1958. The Congress won the elections in 1960 under R. Sankar’s leadership. Though Congress gained majority of seats in the Elections of 1960 to the Kerala Legislative Assembly, Pattom Thanupillai of the Praja Socialist Party was given the Chief Ministership (CM) and Sankar became the Deputy Chief Minister in the Pattom Thanupillai ministry. He handled the portfolio of Finance from 1960 to 1962 when he was the Deputy CM.

R. Sankar became the Chief Minister of Kerala when Pattom Thanupillai was appointed Governor of Punjab State. He was in the chair from 26 September 1962 to 10 September 1964. He had to resign and dismiss the Government under his leadership when a No-confidence motion was passed in the Assembly. He brought about many economic reforms while handling the finance portfolio. He served as the Chairman of the Committee of Privileges from 1960 to 1964.

Sankar died at the age of 63 on 7 November 1972. The Assembly paid its homage to him on 13 November 1972.

Political retirement
R. Sankar contested the general elections held in 1965 to the Kerala Legislative Assembly but was defeated. He thus stepped back from active politics and concentrated in starting and implementing Educational Institutions for SNDP Yogam by settling back in Kollam. At that time he started the Sree Narayana Medical Mission under the SN Trust for giving away free treatment. The first hospital under the mission was started in Kollam, the hospital is also known on his name 'Sankars Hospital' which is now a multispeciality hospital. The body of Sankar was also laid to rest in the Hospital compound as a tribute to his service. 
He was the President of the Committee which erected the statue of poet Kumaranasan in Thiruvananthapuram.

References

Further reading

External links
 SN college chempazhanthy
 
 

1909 births
1972 deaths
Chief Ministers of Kerala
Politicians from Kollam district
Members of the Constituent Assembly of India
University College Thiruvananthapuram alumni
Government Law College, Thiruvananthapuram alumni
Indian National Congress politicians from Kerala
Malayali politicians
Deputy chief ministers of Kerala
Chief ministers from Indian National Congress